American Recordings (formerly Def American Recordings) is an American record label headed by producer Rick Rubin. The label has featured artists such as Slayer, the Black Crowes, ZZ Top, Danzig, Trouble, Tom Petty, Johnny Cash, The Mother Hips, and System of a Down.

Company history 

The label Def American Recordings was founded after Rick Rubin left Def Jam Recordings in 1988. Among the first acts to be signed were Slayer (which followed Rubin from Def Jam), Danzig, The Four Horsemen, Masters of Reality, and Wolfsbane, as well as indie rockers the Jesus and Mary Chain and controversial stand-up comedian Andrew Dice Clay. Rubin continued his association with hip-hop music as well by signing artists such as the Geto Boys and Sir Mix-a-Lot. Def American had its first major success with The Black Crowes' 1990 debut album, Shake Your Money Maker, which was eventually certified quintuple platinum by the RIAA. The group's 1992 follow-up, The Southern Harmony and Musical Companion, gave the label its first No.1 album. Rapper Sir Mix-a-Lot obtained a number-one hit with the song "Baby Got Back" as well as a platinum-selling album entitled Mack Daddy. Heavy metal acts Slayer and Danzig also enjoyed notable commercial success, with Slayer in particular having several gold certified albums. Rubin produced many of the recordings on the label, as well as directing other related ventures.

Rubin changed the name of the company from Def American Recordings to American Recordings in 1993 after reportedly seeing the word "def" in the dictionary. The company was reportedly renamed because he believed that finding the word in a notable source was against the anti-establishment image that he was trying to project. A mock funeral was held for the word "Def" on August 27, 1993. The guest list included Black Panthers with prop shotguns, The Amazing Kreskin, Tom Petty and Rosanna Arquette, The Red Hot Chili Peppers' Flea, Sir Mix-a-Lot and Warner Bros. Records chairman (and pallbearer) Mo Ostin, with Reverend Al Sharpton presiding. Before Def was lowered to its final resting place, some of the 1,500+ mourners placed flowers and various musical and personal memorabilia in the open casket. Afterwards, mourners followed a 19th-century-style horse-drawn hearse and a six-piece brass band playing "Amazing Grace" to the after party—named Ciao Def—at a bowling alley. The new birth certificate was obtained and the company name changed to American Recordings.

American had several sub-labels over the years, including Onion Records, Ill Labels, Wild West, Whte Lbls, and Infinite Zero. The last was a partnership with Henry Rollins that specialized in reissues of obscure albums. None of these labels made the distribution transition after American Recordings left Warner Bros. Records in 1997, and their recordings were deleted.

Distribution 
The first Def American release was Reign in Blood by Slayer, which had a Def Jam Recordings logo on its first pressing. Fans of heavy metal music consider it one of the most critically acclaimed and important albums in the genre's history, and it continues to obtain much high praise from fans and critics. A Def Jam Recordings logo was also present on its follow-up album. However, because Russell Simmons felt that Slayer's music was not in line with Def Jam, and because Def Jam's then-distributor Columbia Records refused to release it, it was released through Geffen Records, and Rubin took the rights of the release to the new label with him after the split. Danzig's 1988 debut album was the first release to bear the Def American logo. Initially, the label was distributed by Geffen through Warner Bros. Records (now known as Warner Records), but when Geffen refused to distribute the self-titled album by the Geto Boys and the controversy it caused, distribution was absorbed by Warner Bros. proper, which released all subsequent Def American titles.

American's distribution has been handled through several labels over the years. American's first incarnation was distributed by Geffen Records through Warner Bros. Records from 1988 to 1990. After a falling-out with Geffen over the content of the Geto Boys' only Def American release, Warner Bros. itself took over distribution duties from 1990 to 1997 in the United States, while the international distribution was handled by BMG. However, sub-label Ill Labels was distributed by hip-hop specialist and former Warner Bros. subsidiary Tommy Boy Records as part of its deal. For a brief time during the 1990s, the label also distributed Too Pure Records in the US.

Rubin signed a distribution deal with Columbia Records in 1997, which distributed the label's titles until 2001. That year, Universal Music Group, through its Island Def Jam Music Group division, took over distribution. In 2005, with the exception of the recordings of Johnny Cash, the label returned to the aegis of Warner Bros. Records. Non-US distribution was handled by Sony Music Entertainment until the deal with Columbia expired.

In 2007, Warner Bros. Records, which was American's home from 1990 to 1997, acquired the rights to the extensive American Recordings catalog, which included Johnny Cash, The Black Crowes, The Jayhawks, Slayer, and Danzig. However, American's current roster (except Tom Petty) was transferred to BMG successor Sony BMG (now known as Sony Music Entertainment) in mid-2007 after a legal battle between Warner and Rubin over the details of their former arrangement, in which American Recordings would sign and provide creative services for artists, while Warner Bros. was only to handle promotion, sales, marketing, and distribution because Rubin was prompted to move his label with his appointment to co-chairman of Columbia Records in the spring of 2007.

In 2012, Rick Rubin, upon his exit from Sony Music Entertainment, signed a new deal with Universal Republic Records (now Republic Records) for a new incarnation of American Recordings. The first albums to be released under this new deal were ZZ Top's La Futura and The Avett Brothers' The Carpenter. During this period, American moved all of its catalog to Universal Music Group, the exceptions being System of a Down, which remained with Columbia Records & Sony Music Entertainment, plus Chino XL's Here To Save You All and Tom Petty's Highway Companion, which remained with Warner Records & Warner Music Group.

Current artists 
 The Avett Brothers
 Band of Horses
 Denny Weston Jr.
 Kae Tempest
 System of a Down
 ZZ Top

Former artists 

 American Head Charge
 Dan Baird
 Barkmarket
 Frank Black
 The Black Crowes
 Blackeyed Susans
 Johnny Cash
 Chino XL
 Andrew "Dice" Clay
 Julian Cope
 Danzig
 Deconstruction
 Digital Orgasm (Whte Lbls/American)
 DJ Kool
 Donovan
 Pete Droge
 Electric Company (Onion/American)
 Fireside
 Flipper
 The Four Horsemen
 The Freewheelers
 John Frusciante
 Geto Boys
 God Dethroned
 God Lives Underwater
 Gogol Bordello
 The Jayhawks
 The Jesus and Mary Chain
 Kwest Tha Madd Lad
 Nusrat Fateh Ali Khan
 Laika
 Lords of Acid (Whte Lbls/American)
 Lordz of Brooklyn (Ventrue/American)
 Loudermilk
 Love and Rockets
 Luna Halo
 Manmade God
 Masters of Reality
 MC 900 Ft. Jesus
 Medicine
 Messiah (Whte Lbls/American)
 Milk
 The Mother Hips
 Mouse on Mars (Too Pure/American)
 Noise Ratchet
 The Nonce (Wild West/American)
 Ours
 Paloalto
 Tom Petty
 Jonny Polonsky
 Pram
 Psychotica
 Raging Slab
 The Red Devils
 The Jim Rose Circus Sideshow
 Ruth Ruth
 Sir Mix-a-Lot (Rhyme Cartel/American)
 Skinny Puppy
 Slayer
 Stiffs, Inc.
 Supreme Love Gods
 Survival Research Laboratories
 Swell
 Thee Hypnotics
 Th' Faith Healers
 Thomas Jefferson Slave Apartments
 Trouble
 Unida
 Saul Williams
 Wesley Willis
 Wolfsbane

Soundtracks 
 Big Daddy
 Chef Aid: The South Park Album
 The Doom Generation
 Jackass: The Movie

Infinite Zero Reissue Artists 

 James Chance And The Contortions
 Devo
 Flipper
 Gang of Four
 Louise Huebner
 Iceberg Slim
 Mississippi Fred McDowell
 The Monks
 Matthew Shipp
 Trouble Funk
 Alan Vega
 Tom Verlaine
 Alan Watts
 James White and the Blacks

See also 
 List of record labels

References

External links 
 
 

Record labels established in 1988
American record labels
Alternative rock record labels
Rock record labels
Hip hop record labels
Heavy metal record labels
Thrash metal record labels
Warner Records
Columbia Records
Universal Music Group
Rick Rubin